Alpha Chi Rho, commonly known as Crows, Crow, or AXP, is a men's collegiate fraternity founded on June 4, 1895, at Trinity College in Hartford, Connecticut, by the Reverend Paul Ziegler, his son Carl Ziegler, and Carl's friends William H. Rouse, Herbert T. Sherriff and William A.D. Eardeley. It is a charter member of the North American Interfraternity Conference, and its national headquarters is R.B. Stewart National Headquarters, located in Neptune, New Jersey. The symbol of the fraternity is the labarum and men of Alpha Chi Rho are commonly called "Crows."

The Revered Fathers of Alpha Chi Rho
 Rev. Paul Ziegler, Trinity '72 – He was Phi Beta Kappa and valedictorian of his class, member of the Beta Beta society as a student, devoted his life to the ministry, composed the Landmarks and Ritual, and designed the Fraternity Badge. He was the original author of the Exoteric Manual. All four of his sons were in Alpha Chi Rho and ministers of the Episcopal Church: Carl G., Phi Psi; Howard B., Phi Psi; Winfred H., Phi Omega; and Eustice P., Phi Gamma.
 Rev. Carl Ziegler, Trinity '97 – He was the oldest son of Founder Paul Ziegler, Phi Beta Kappa, lifelong Episcopal clergyman, National Chaplain for many years and the last to enter the chapter eternal.
 William H. Rouse, Trinity '96  – "his sage advice and tactful approach was invaluable during infancy of our Fraternity." He was the first President of Phi Psi Chapter, a teacher by profession who spent the later years of his life in Florida teaching English to Cuban and South American immigrants.
Herbert T. Sherriff, Trinity '97 – He attended high school and college with Carl G. Ziegler, and wrote the first installment of the fraternity's history. He had a career in public health in Portland, Oregon.
 Rev. William A.D. Eardeley, Trinity '97 – He started his career as an Episcopal minister and later became a noted genealogist. He was the first National President of the Fraternity and designed the Coat of Arms. He helped form Phi Chi and Phi Phi Chapters.

Chapters

Notable Brothers

See also
List of social fraternities and sororities

Notes

External links
Alpha Chi Rho website

 
North American Interfraternity Conference
Student societies in the United States
Student organizations established in 1895
Trinity College (Connecticut)
1895 establishments in Connecticut